Amélie Goudjo (born 19 April 1980, in Nantua, France) is a former French handball player. She was member of the French national team.

She participated at the 2009 World Women's Handball Championship in China, winning a silver medal with the French team.

References

External links

1980 births
Living people
People from Nantua
French female handball players
Sportspeople from Ain
Expatriate handball players
French expatriate sportspeople in Spain
French expatriate sportspeople in Slovenia
Mediterranean Games gold medalists for France
Competitors at the 2005 Mediterranean Games
Competitors at the 2009 Mediterranean Games
Mediterranean Games medalists in handball